The International Whaling Commission meeting in 2006 was held 16 June–20 June in St Kitts and Nevis. Pro whaling countries unsuccessfully challenged the 1982 moratorium, yet succeeded in shifting the IWC focus from whale conservation to management of commercial whaling. 
A full provisional meeting agenda can be seen here :Annotated Provisional Agenda (PDF)
Live coverage of the Meeting is available each year here:

1st Day, 16 June 2006

Of the two votes proposed by Japan on the first day, both were defeated by narrow majorities. 30–32 in the case of removing small cetaceans from IWC competence and 30–33 on the proposal to introduce secret ballots. A number of countries, Costa Rica, Gambia, Peru, Togo and others either were not present at the vote or had not completed their registration procedures/fees payments before the votes. At least three of these countries have now arrived and/or completed their registration and are now eligible to vote, suggesting that the voting on resolutions may be much closer for the remainder of the meeting.

2nd Day, 17 June 2006

The Bowhead whale stock from which the Alaskans take their quota is now estimated to be 10,500 with a growth rate of more than 3%. Apparently a record number of calves were counted in the recent survey work.
Greenland voluntarily introduced a reduction in fin whales taken following advice from the IWC Scientific committee (IWC SC) that the catch of 19 animals may not be a safe level of catch and noted that this left Greenland with a shortfall of 220 tons of whalemeat from their quota of 670 tons. They made enquiries into the stock levels of Humpback whales and Bowhead whales around Greenland with the possible intent of opening up a hunt eventually on these two species to make up the shortfall. This of course alarmed anti-whaling countries and NGO's immediately . 

The RMS was discussed yet again in depth to no avail, with the chairman of the IWC, Henrik Fischer, noting that RMS discussions are at an impasse and that he will close discussion on the RMS on the afternoon of 18 June if nobody comes up with any new ideas.
Japan suggested a meeting to discuss the " normalisation" of the IWC, which was commented / debated upon in detail, resulting in the agreement of many countries to attend any arranged meeting with open minds.

Japan proposed a schedule amendment regarding its coastal whaling communities to take a small number of Minke whales From the "O" Stock. After much discussion, the proposal was defeated with 30 votes for the proposal and 31 votes against with 4 abstentions. (As a schedule amendment, the proposal would have required a three quarters majority to pass.)

3rd Day, 18 June 2006

Discussion of the southern ocean sanctuary as well as a Caribbean sanctuary proposed by France. The vote on whether to remove the southern ocean sanctuary was defeated by 28–33 with 5 abstentions. The French delegate was verbally denounced by a number of Caribbean nations for not discussing their proposed sanctuary with any of the other Caribbean nations in advance of their proposal and the proposal was not voted upon.
The St Kitts and Nevis Declaration  was discussed and voted upon, and adopted with 33 votes in favour, 32 against, and one abstention, the first time in more than two decades that the Whaling Commission has expressed support for commercial whaling. The Declaration declared the moratorium on whaling "no longer necessary".

Protest

Dolphin activist Richard O’Barry livened up the proceedings by walking into the Plenary session wearing a TV screen on his chest which was showing video footage of the dolphin slaughter in Taiji, Japan and other coastal cities. He paraded past the astonished Japanese delegation before security surrounded him and hustled him from the hall.

References

2006 in economics
2006 in law
2006 in the environment
International Whaling Commission